The Australian Women's Championships is an annual event run by the Australian Baseball Federation. The Championship includes the women's Queensland Rams, Western Australia Heat, Victoria Aces, New South Wales Patriots as well as Victorian Provincial, a New South Wales Country team and Australian Capital Territory.

The tournament for the first 10 years was dominated by Victoria, winning nine and only rivalled by New South Wales, who have won two tournaments. This is mainly due to the strong women's baseball competition in Victoria, which includes 33 teams over three divisions, perhaps the largest local women's baseball competition in the world.

In 2010, the Western Australia Heat went through the tournament undefeated, defeating New South Wales in the final 7–6. This was the first final without Victoria competing in it and the first time Western Australia won the tournament.

Championships
2021 Adelaide, South Australia - Cancelled due to COVID-19
2020 Canberra, Australian Capital Territory - Cancelled due to COVID-19
2019 Canberra, Australian Capital Territory – Victoria
2018 Geelong, Victoria – New South Wales
2017 Canberra, Australian Capital Territory – Victoria
2016 Canberra, Australian Capital Territory – New South Wales
2015 Canberra, Australian Capital Territory – New South Wales
2014 Sydney, New South Wales – New South Wales
2013 Ballarat, Victoria – Victoria
2012 Canberra, Australian Capital Territory – Western Australia
2011 Canberra, Australian Capital Territory – Victoria
2010 Gold Coast, Queensland – Western Australia
2009 Geelong, Victoria – Victoria
2008 Wollongong, New South Wales – Victoria
2007 Perth, Western Australia – Victoria
2006 Ipswich, Queensland – New South Wales
2005 Melbourne – Victoria
2004 Tamworth, New South Wales – Victoria
2003 Perth, Western Australia – New South Wales
2002 Gold Coast, Queensland – Victoria
2001 Sydney – Victoria
2000 Melbourne – Victoria
1999 Melbourne – Victoria

See also

 Women's baseball in Australia
Baseball awards#Australia

References

External links
National Women's Program Home
 National Women's Championship History

Baseball competitions in Australia
Women's baseball in Australia
1999 establishments in Australia
Recurring sporting events established in 1999
Women's sports competitions in Australia
Women's baseball competitions